The 2014–15 Zenit Saint Petersburg season was the 19th successive season that the club participated in the Russian Premier League, the highest tier of football in Russia. During the season, they participated in the Russian Premier League, the Russian Cup, the 2014–15 UEFA Champions League and the 2014–15 UEFA Europa League.

Squad

On loan

Youth team squad

Transfers

Summer

In:

Out:

Winter

In:

Out:

Competitions

Russian Premier League

League table

Results by round

Matches

Russian Cup

UEFA Champions League

Third qualifying round

Play-off round

Group stage

UEFA Europa League

Round of 32

Round of 16

Quarter-final

Squad statistics

Appearances and goals

|-
|colspan="14"|Players away from the club on loan:
|-
|colspan="14"|Players who appeared for Zenit St. Petersburg no longer at the club:
|}

Goalscorers

Disciplinary record

Notes
 MSK time changed from UTC+4 to UTC+3 permanently on 26 October 2014.

References

FC Zenit Saint Petersburg seasons
Zenit Saint Petersburg
Zenit Saint Petersburg
Russian football championship-winning seasons